Stenostola niponensis is a species of beetle in the family Cerambycidae. It was described by Maurice Pic in 1901.

Subspecies
 Stenostola niponensis niponensis Pic, 1901
 Stenostola niponensis konoi Kano, 1933
 Stenostola niponensis pterocaryai Hayashi, 1960

References

Saperdini
Beetles described in 1901